Aromatic and Medicinal Plants Research Station, Odakkali is a research Station under the Central Zone of Kerala Agricultural University at Odakkali in Ernakulam district of Kerala, India. This station was established in 1951 as Lemongrass Breeding Station by the Travancore-Cochin Government. Later in 1972 after the formation of Kerala Agricultural University the research station was brought under the control of KAU. The station was renamed as Aromatic and Medicinal Plants Research Station (AMPRS) in 1982. 

In 1994, Ministry of Agriculture, of India upgraded the phytochemical laboratory of this station as one of the Regional Analytical Laboratories for medicinal and aromatic plants. 

In 2008, some augmented facilities were inaugurated as a step in the research station’s bid to acquire the status of a centre of excellence in aromatic and medicinal plants in the country.

References

External links
 Official Website 

Herbalism organizations
Agricultural research stations in Kerala
Education in Ernakulam district
1951 establishments in India
Research institutes established in 1951